Christoph Ernst is a German civil servant, who was Chairman of the Administrative Council of the European Patent Organisation from 1 October 2017 until October 2018. In October 2018, he was appointed Vice-President of the European Patent Office's (EPO) Directorate-General Legal and International Affairs, starting on 1 January 2019, and he then resigned from his position as Chairman of the Administrative Council.

References

Year of birth missing (living people)
Place of birth missing (living people)
Living people
European Patent Organisation people
21st-century German civil servants
20th-century German civil servants